Boroughmuir Blaze Basketball Club is a basketball club based in the city of Edinburgh, Scotland.

History

Boroughmuir (1961-2004)
The club was founded in 1961 with an initial nucleus of players from Edinburgh's Boroughmuir High School.  The club's heyday came in the late 1960s when players like Tony Wilson, Mel Capaldi, John Tunnah, Brian Carmichael and Bill McInnes went on to form the backbone of the Scotland national basketball team. A highlight of this period came in 1967 when Boroughmuir became the first British team to participate in a European cup competition. They were drawn against the mighty Real Madrid and played their home tie at Murrayfield Ice Rink before a crowd of nearly 1,000.

Blaze (2004-present)
The Blaze moniker was introduced in 2004 and in recent years the club has rejuvenated its development program with the club now having over 100 members with teams at every age group from Under 12 through to Over 50s. The club's growth is reflected by entry in the U16 National League since 2005/06 and the U18 National League from 2006/07. The Senior Men's team re-entered the National League in 2011 after 3 years away, and won their first National League title in 38 years, and completed the league-playoffs double, in 2016.

Teams

Men's Squads
Senior Men 2 teams (National League Division 1, National League Division 2)
U18 Men 2 teams (National League Division 1, National League Division 2)
U16 Men 3 teams (National League Divisions 1, 2 & 3)
U14 Boys 2 teams (East/Central Regional Development League)
U12 Boys 2 teams (East/Central Regional Development League)

Women's Squads
Senior Women (National League Division 1)
U18 Women (National League Division 1)
U16 Women (National League Division 1)
U14 Girls (East/Central Regional Development League)
U12 Girls (East/Central Regional Development League)
U10 Girls (East/Central Regional Development League)

Season-by-season records
Prior to the 1997–98 season, Boroughmuir competed in every National League season since its formation in 1969, winning 9 of their 10 league titles to date consecutively (1969–70, 1970–71, 1971–72, 1972–73, 1973–74, 1974–75, 1975–76, 1976–77, 1977–78).

Record in European competition

References

External links
Official site

Basketball teams in Scotland
Sports teams in Edinburgh
1961 establishments in Scotland
Basketball teams established in 1961